A penumbral lunar eclipse took place on Friday, February 10, 1933. The moon just barely passed into the northern edge of the earth's penumbral shadow.

Visibility

Related lunar eclipses

See also
List of lunar eclipses
List of 20th-century lunar eclipses

Notes

External links

1933-02
1933 in science